Ebba d'Aubert, née Bergström (1819–1860) was a Swedish concert pianist.

She was married to the second concert conductor at the Kungliga Hovkapellet, violinist Theodor Adolf Eduard d’Aubert. She became an Associé of the Royal Swedish Academy of Music in 1849.

References 
 Johan Leonard Höijer, Musik-Lexikon

1819 births
Members of the Royal Swedish Academy of Music
1860 deaths
Swedish classical pianists
Swedish women pianists
Swedish pianists
19th-century classical pianists
19th-century Swedish musicians
19th-century Swedish women musicians
19th-century women pianists